The Boston Opera House was an opera house located on Huntington Avenue in Boston, Massachusetts.

Speare Hall, a Northeastern University dormitory, now stands on the site at the corner of Opera Place and Huntington Avenue.

History

Construction
Designed by the Boston architects Wheelwright and Haven, construction began on the Boston Opera House in 1901 but due to financial difficulties the completion of the opera house was delayed. Eventually Bostonian millionaire Eben Jordan, Jr. stepped forward in 1908 to provide the funds to finish the building and provide a home for the newly formed Boston Opera Company (BOC) under the leadership of impresario Henry Russell. Guido Nincheri provided interior decoration for the theatre which was located two blocks from Boston Symphony Hall, and one block from the New England Conservatory of Music.

Opening
The opera house officially opened on November 8, 1909 with a performance of La Gioconda by the BOC. The production starred Lillian Nordica in the title role and Louise Homer as La Cieca. At its opening, the theatre was described as a "perfect jewel-box of an opera house". It served as the home of the BOC during the company's six years of operation. Russell served as the company's director for all its short duration and Arnaldo Conti was the conductor from 1909–1913. After the BOC went bankrupt in 1915 the venue was used by other local opera companies, as well as by the Metropolitan Opera for its regular visits.

Demise
During the Great Depression and World War II, the Opera House fell into disuse and disrepair.

In 1957, the Boston Redevelopment Authority, acting on behalf of the Northeastern University Trustees, declared it unsafe, and scheduled it for demolition. The local opera community demonstrated and petitioned the BRA to spare their only venue, but the order stood. The solidly built building was gutted in 1958, but proved difficult to demolish. Two demolition companies gave up in frustration, as the opera house resisted their efforts. Only after a new and larger wrecking derrick arrived, did the walls fall.

A brick rescued from the demolished theater by noted WGBH-FM announcer Ron Della Chiesa is preserved in the theater's archives at Northeastern University. The archived plans for the Opera House may be viewed and copied by requesting an appointment with Northeastern University's Facilities or Space Planning and Design Department.

References

Further reading
 
 Henry Charles Lahee. The grand opera singers of to-day: an account of the leading operatic stars who have sung during recent years, together with a sketch of the chief operatic enterprises. Boston: L.C. Page and Company, 1912

External links

Eichler, Jeremy, "The rise and fall of the original Boston Opera House", The Boston Globe, November 8, 2009.
Program for 1910 productions on New York Public Library website nypl.org
Program for 1910 productions on New York Public Library website nypl.org
Program for 1920 productions on New York Public Library website nypl.org
Postcard on New York Public Library website nypl.org
Aerial photo of Boston Opera House and vicinity, 1950s on Flickr.cmom

See also
Boston Opera House (1980)

Opera houses in Massachusetts
Opera House, Boston
Landmarks in Fenway–Kenmore
Opera House, Boston
20th century in Boston
Fenway–Kenmore
Music venues completed in 1909
1909 establishments in Massachusetts
Theatres completed in 1909
Buildings and structures demolished in 1958
Demolished buildings and structures in Boston